342843 Davidbowie, provisional designation , is a Henan asteroid from the central region of the asteroid belt, approximately 1.4 kilometers in diameter.

The asteroid was discovered on 21 December 2008, by German astronomer Felix Hormuth from Max-Planck-Institute for Astronomy at Calar Alto Observatory in Almería, southeastern Spain. It was named for British singer-songwriter David Bowie.

Orbit and classification 

Davidbowie is a member of the Henan family, a large family of L-type asteroids in the intermediate main-belt, named after 2085 Henan. It orbits the Sun in the central asteroid belt at a distance of 2.5–3.0 AU once every 4 years and 7 months (1,665 days; semi-major axis of 2.75 AU). The asteroid has a well-observed orbit with the lowest possible condition code. Its orbit has an eccentricity of 0.09 and an inclination of 3° with respect to the ecliptic.

Notably, the asteroid had a close encounter with the 200 kilometer-sized asteroid 16 Psyche, one of the most massive bodies in the main-belt, which it passed at only  on 15 May 1935.

Physical characteristics 

Based on its absolute magnitude of 17.1, Davidbowies diameter can be estimated to measure approximately 1.4 kilometers, using an albedo of 0.13, derived from the family's parent body, 2085 Henan.

As of 2017, Davidbowies effective size and shape, as well as its poles, albedo and rotation period remain unknown.

Naming 

In 2015, this minor planet was named after British singer, songwriter, producer and actor, David Bowie (1947–2016), just 3 days before Bowie's 68th birthday. Considered to be one of the most influential artists, Bowie released more than 25 albums including The Rise and Fall of Ziggy Stardust and the Spiders from Mars. He was also an actor in movies such as Labyrinth and The Prestige. The approved naming citation was published by the Minor Planet Center on 5 January 2015,

References

External links 
 Minor Planet Center MPC Archive, 
 Asteroid Lightcurve Database (LCDB), query form (info )
 Dictionary of Minor Planet Names, Google books
 Asteroids and comets rotation curves, CdR – Observatoire de Genève, Raoul Behrend
 Discovery Circumstances: Numbered Minor Planets (340001)-(345000) – Minor Planet Center
 
 

342843
Discoveries by Felix Hormuth
Named minor planets
20081221